Lurgan is a parish and Electoral Division, County Cavan, Ireland. Lurgan is also part of the historical barony of Castlerahan. The parish is part of the Diocese of Kilmore. The parish is also sometimes today called Virginia, after the largest town in the parish and surrounding area.

Population
In the 1837, the parish had a population of 6387 and an area of 11328 statute acres.

In 2011, the Electoral Division of Lurgan has a population of 565 and an area of 14.46 square kilometers.

References

Geography of County Cavan